Julia Marciari-Alexander (born 1967) is an American art historian and curator who is director of the Walters Art Museum.

Marciari-Alexander began her career at the Yale Center for British Art, where she was curator of paintings and sculpture and later an associate director of the museum. In 2008, she joined the San Diego Museum of Art as its head curator, and served as an interim director following the departure of the museum director in 2009.

Marciari-Alexander assumed her current position at the Walters Art Museum in 2013. As director, she has overseen the completion of a seven-year endowment campaign as well as the renovation of the Hackerman House, which holds the museum's collection of Asian art.

Early life and education 
Julia Marciari-Alexander was born in Memphis, Tennessee in 1967, the daughter of David and Catharine Alexander. Her father David was president of Pomona College and the American secretary of the Rhodes Trust. Her mother worked at Pomona College as the coordinator of special events.

Marciari-Alexander grew up in Claremont, California. She recalls her interest in art began in the sixth grade, when she attended Mass at St. Peter's Basilica on a trip to Rome and saw "how architecture and art and life can create these moments of wonder".

Marciari-Alexander attended Wellesley College, where she studied art history and French and became a member of Phi Beta Kappa. She graduated magna cum laude in 1989. As part of a Théodore Rousseau Fellowship offered by the Metropolitan Museum of Art, she studied abroad at New York University in Paris and London and obtained a master's degree in French literature in 1992. She then moved to New Haven, Connecticut to attend Yale University and earned a master's degree and PhD in art history in 1993 and 1999, respectively.

Career

Yale Center for British Art 
Marciari-Alexander began her career at the Yale Center for British Art at Yale University in 1996, first as curator of paintings and sculpture, and later its associate director of programmatic affairs and associate director for exhibitions and publication. Her 2007 exhibition, Howard Hodgkin: Paintings 1992-2007, was named one of Time magazine's ten top museum exhibitions of the year.

San Diego Museum of Art 
In 2008, Marciari-Alexander returned to California to become the San Diego Museum of Art's deputy director for curatorial affairs. After director Derrick Cartwright left the museum in 2009, Marciari-Alexander served as one of four co-interim directors of the museum. In 2011, the LA Times highlighted the museum's installation of Thomas Gainsborough and the Modern Woman as one of the ten best California museum shows of the year.

As deputy director, Marciari-Alexander oversaw the reinstallation of all the museum's public galleries. She also managed a four-year partnership between Balboa Park and the Diamond Neighborhoods communities of San Diego, which resulted in the opening of a community gallery and performing space in 2012.

Walters Art Museum 

In 2013, Marciari-Alexander succeeded Gary Vikan as director of the Walters Art Museum in Baltimore, Maryland. She is the museum's fifth director and the first woman in the position. The museum is known for its collection of medieval art; Marciari-Alexander, who has a scholarly background in British art, is also the museum's first non-medievalist director since 1965.

Under Marciari-Alexander's tenure, in 2015, the museum completed a $30 million endowment campaign started just before the Lehman Brothers went bankrupt in 2008. She later oversaw the restoration and "rethink" of the museum's Hackerman House, which holds its collection of Asian art.

In 2021, Marciari-Alexander and her administration became the subjects of controversy after several employees fell ill from toxic vapors related to on-site museum construction.

Anti-Labor Hostility 

Throughout 2021 and 2022, as a majority of Walters Art Museum staff signed union cards and signaled intention to form an all-inclusive trade union, Marciari-Alexander has consistently refused to recognize the union or meet with the organizing employees. In October of 2021, Marciari-Alexander's lack of willingness to acknowledge the union and address working conditions at the museum spurred the Baltimore City Council and Comptroller of Baltimore City to issue formal requests to allow for a neutral third-party election, inclusive of all staff. Under advisory from union-busting law firm Shawe Rosenthal LLP, Marciari-Alexander remained defiant, refusing to acknowledge the union or meet with her employees.

In 2022, Baltimore mayor Brandon Scott sent Marciari-Alexander a letter requesting that she allow the employees to hold an independent union election.

Personal life 
Marciari-Alexander married  in 1996. John Marciari heads the drawings and prints department at the Morgan Library and Museum. He previously worked with Marciari-Alexander as a curator at the San Diego Museum of Art. They have two children and reside in the Homeland neighborhood of Baltimore.

References

External links 
 Official biography on the Walters Art Museum website

Living people
1967 births
Directors of museums in the United States
Women museum directors
American art curators
American women curators
American art historians
Women art historians
Wellesley College alumni
New York University alumni
Yale University alumni
People from Claremont, California
People from Memphis, Tennessee
Historians from California
21st-century American women